Keith Haynes (born 1963, Cardiff, Wales) is a Welsh author and musician.

Biography
Haynes was brought up in Northampton and attended Parklands infants school and then the junior school until his family split and moved to London in 1974. Living in Marble Arch, he attended St Georges School in Hanover Square before returning to the nomadic travellers lifestyle travelling to Lanarkshire and Essex for periods with intermittent schooling. He moved to Wales in 1977, where he attended Sir Thomas Picton School in Haverfordwest. There he formed punk rock band Picture Frame Seduction. In 1980 he appeared on the compilation album Demolition Blues with the song "Getcha Rocks Off". This is referenced in an interview with Haynes and ex-manager Jan Molby by BBC Radio Wales in 2002 after his football supporters group based in Gloucester assisted local fans in ousting then Swansea City owners from the club.

Picture Frame Seduction split up, then reformed in 1999. In 2004 the band featured in Burning Britain: A history of UK Punk Rock.

Publications
In 1998, Haynes published his first book, titled Come on Cymru.  His second, in 1999, was Come on Cymru 2000.  He has since written books on professional and international footballers and on local history. He has also broadcast for the BBC in Wales and written for mainstream newspapers and publications including The Daily Mirror. His most recent books have been biographical accounts of his experiences following Swansea City.

Books
 Come on Cymru, Sigma, 1998, Keith Haynes
 Come on Cymru 2000, Sigma, 1999, Keith Haynes
 Vetch Field Voices, A oral history, Tempus, 2000, Keith Haynes
 Roger Freestone, Another Day at the Office, Tempus, 2001, Keith Haynes
 100 Swansea City Greats, NPI Media Group 2003, Keith Haynes
 The Tony Ford Story, The History Press Ltd 2005, Keith Haynes
 Gloucester, Photographic Memories, Francis Frith, Keith Haynes
 Walking on Sunshine, The History Press 2011, Keith Haynes
 Shine on Swansea City, The History Press 2012,  Keith Haynes

References

External links
Keith Haynes
Picture Frame Seduction part biography / discography
Keith Haynes BBC interview 2008
Keith Haynes interview 2003
Keith Haynes Discharge drummer 1980

Living people
1963 births
Musicians from Cardiff
Writers from Cardiff
Welsh non-fiction writers